FSTV may refer to:
 Fast-scan television in Amateur TV, as opposed to slow-scan television
 Free Speech TV, in Denver